The Blue Penny Museum a museum dedicated to history and art of Mauritius, is situated at Caudan Waterfront in Port Louis, the capital of Mauritius. It opened in November 2001.

The museum collection includes the 1847 Blue Penny and Red Penny stamps. The stamps were bought in 1993 for $2,000,000 by a consortium of Mauritian enterprises headed by The Mauritius Commercial Bank and brought back to Mauritius after almost 150 years. For conservation, the originals are illuminated only temporarily. Most of the time only copies are to be seen.

The museum, founded by The Mauritius Commercial Bank, also houses the original statue of Paul and Virginia, created in 1881 by Prosper d'Épinay.

References

External links 
 Blue Penny Museum, Blue Penny Museum Website
  Mauritius Stamps Album

Museums established in 2001
Museums in Mauritius
Philatelic museums
Philately of Mauritius